Inna Oleksandrivna Zhurakovska (born 2 April 1956), also known as Inna Aleksandrovna Zhurakovskaya, is a Ukrainian equestrian. She competed for the Unified Team in two events at the 1992 Summer Olympics.

References

External links
 

1956 births
Living people
Ukrainian female equestrians
Ukrainian dressage riders
Olympic equestrians of the Unified Team
Equestrians at the 1992 Summer Olympics
Sportspeople from Vinnytsia Oblast